The 2013 Dahsyatnya Awards was an awards show for Indonesian musicians. It was the fifth annual show. The show was held on January 21, 2013, at the Jakarta International Expo in Kemayoran, Central Jakarta. The awards show was hosted by Raffi Ahmad, Olga Syahputra, Ayu Dewi, Denny Cagur, Marcel Chandrawinata, Gisella Anastasia, Melaney Ricardo, Ajun Perwira, Kevin Julio, and Olla Ramlan. The awards ceremonies will held theme for "Wujudkan Kedahsyatan Cinta".

Noah led the nominations with four categories, followed by Ungu with three nominations. Andien was the biggest winner of the night, taking home two awards for Outstanding Video Clip and Outstanding Video Clip Director, both for "Gemilang".

Winners and nominees
Winners are listed first and highlighted on boldface.

SMS

Jury

References

2013 music awards
Dahsyatnya Awards
Indonesian music awards